The Southeast Missouri State Redhawks women's basketball team, also formerly known as the Southeast Missouri State Otahkians, represents Southeast Missouri State University in Cape Girardeau, Missouri.  The school's team currently competes in the Ohio Valley Conference.

History
Southeast Missouri State began play in 1975, with Division I play beginning in 1991. They finished as runner up to North Dakota State in the 1991 NCAA Division II women's basketball tournament, losing 81–74. The Redhawks have an all-time record of 586–522 and a Division I record of 310–262 as of the end of 2015–16 season. They have been to the NCAA Tournament twice and the WNIT once. They have won the OVC title officially twice, as they won the 2007 and 2020 titles. They vacated the 2006 title due to NCAA sanctions.

Postseason

NCAA Division I Tournament results

NCAA Division II tournament results
The Redhawks, then known as the Otahkians, made eight appearances in the NCAA Division II women's basketball tournament. They had a combined record of 6–8.

AIAW College Division/Division II
The Redhawks, then known as the Otahkians, made one appearance in the AIAW National Division II basketball tournament, with a combined record of 0–1.

References

External links